Landscape products refers to a group of building industry products used by garden designers and landscape architects and exhibited at trade fairs devoted to these industries. It includes: walls, fences, paving, gardening tools, outdoor lighting, water features, fountains, garden furniture, garden ornaments, gazebos, garden buildings, pond liners. 

Geosynthetics are another group of products used extensively in landscape construction for drainage, filtration, reinforcement and separation. Geotextiles are used for drainage to either convey or allow water penetration and to prevent the mixing of two different materials; geomembranes are used to contain liquids in ponds or wastes in landfills; geogrids and geocells are used for load support and to increase the bearing capacity of weak soils; and geocells are used for slope and channel protection and erosion control. 

The skills of combining these products to produce places are known as landscape design and landscape detailing.

See also
Garden design
Soft landscape materials
Hard landscape materials

References

Gardening aids
Garden design